Founded in 2000 by Jim Weidner, K2JXW, the Amateur Radio Lighthouse Society (ARLHS) is devoted to maritime communications, amateur radio, lighthouses, and lightships.  Its members travel to lighthouses around the world where they operate amateur radio equipment at or near the light.  Collecting lighthouse QSLs is popular for some amateur radio operators.  ARLHS is a membership organization with over 1665 members worldwide as of July 2009.

A convention is held in October each year. In 2010 the gathering was in Biloxi, Mississippi. In earlier years it has been held in Solomons, Maryland, St. Simons, Georgia, Port Huron, Michigan, and other sites.

The ARLHS has been featured in national magazines, such as CQ and WordRadio. Jim Weidner is its founding President; and Jim Buffington, K5JIM, is vice president.  The club call sign is W7QF and the website is

World List of Lights 
The ARLHS maintains a catalog of lighthouses called The World List of Lights (WLOL).  Its main feature is a short, and easily transmitted identification number for each lighthouse. The WLOL lists any lighthouse that is or was an Aid to Navigation (ATN) and can reasonably accommodate an amateur radio operation.  Lights that are no longer in existence, but were once an ATN, also show up on the list, designated as historical.  With over 15,000 entries, the WLOL is one of the most complete lighthouse catalogs in existence.

References

External links 
Amateur Radio Lighthouse Society Website
ARLHS Convention web site 
India's First ARLHS activation in Mahaballipuram, Chennai, India Aug 2008
Kadalur Lighthouse Centenary and ILLW operation Aug 2009

Amateur radio organizations
Lighthouse organizations